Delfosse is a surname of French origin. Notable people with the surname include:

Ana Delfosse (1931 - 2017), Argentinian race-car driver
Charles Delfosse (1913 - unknown), Belgian sailor
Noël Delfosse (1801 - 1858), Belgian lawyer
Sébastien Delfosse (born 1982), Belgian professional road bicycle racer

French-language surnames